Martin Gendron (born February 15, 1974) is a Canadian former ice hockey forward.

Biography
Gendron was born in Salaberry-de-Valleyfield, Quebec. As a youth, he played in the 1988 Quebec International Pee-Wee Hockey Tournament with a minor ice hockey team from Salaberry-de-Valleyfield.

Drafted in 1992 by the Washington Capitals, he spent about four seasons in the Capitals system before he was traded to the Chicago Blackhawks. Unable to break into the lineup in Chicago, Gendron remained in the minors until he left to play in Europe in 2000.

Gendron was the top goal scorer in the 1994 World Junior Ice Hockey Championships. 

Gendron was the top goalscorer in the Swiss League during the 2002–03 and 2003–2004 seasons.

Career
1990-1993: Saint-Hyacinthe Laser
1992-1993: Baltimore Skipjacks
1993-1994: Hull Olympiques
1994-1996: Portland Pirates
1994-1996: Washington Capitals
1996-1997: Las Vegas Thunder
1997-1998: Indianapolis Ice
1997-1998: Milwaukee Admirals
1997-1998: Fredericton Canadiens
1997-1998: Chicago Blackhawks
1998-1999: Fredericton Canadiens
1999-2000: Syracuse Crunch
1999-2000: Springfield Falcons
2000-2001: Frankfurt Lions
2001-2002: Associazione Sportiva Asiago Hockey
2002-2005: EHC Olten
2005-2006: Hockey Club Bolzano
2006-2007: Saint-Hyacinthe Top Design
2007-2008: EHC Chur
2007-2008: Trois-Rivières Caron & Guay

References

External links

1974 births
Living people
Baltimore Skipjacks players
Canadian ice hockey right wingers
Chicago Blackhawks players
Fredericton Canadiens players
French Quebecers
Hull Olympiques players
Ice hockey people from Quebec
Indianapolis Ice players
Las Vegas Thunder players
Portland Pirates players
Saint-Hyacinthe Laser players
Sportspeople from Salaberry-de-Valleyfield
Springfield Falcons players
Washington Capitals draft picks
Washington Capitals players